James Donovan may refer to:

 James Donovan (Boston politician) (1859–1929), Democratic politician from Boston
 James B. Donovan (1916–1970), lawyer and US Navy officer
 James G. Donovan (1898–1987), Democratic politician, New York State Senator and US congressman
 James H. Donovan (1923–1990), Republican politician, New York State Senator
 James J. Donovan (1890–1971), mayor of Bayonne, New Jersey 1939–1943

See also
 Jim Donovan (disambiguation)